Greenwoodochromis bellcrossi is a species of fish in the family Cichlidae. is endemic to the deep waters of Lake Tanganyika, East Africa. The specific name of thisfish honours the South African ichthyologist Graham Bell-Cross (1927-1998) who was deputy executive director of the National Museums and Monuments of Rhodesia.

References

.

bellcrossi
Cichlid fish of Africa
Fish of Lake Tanganyika
Fish described in 1976
Taxa named by Max Poll
Taxonomy articles created by Polbot